Calosoma granatense is a species of ground beetle in the subfamily of Carabinae. It was described by Gehin in 1885.

References

granatense
Beetles described in 1885